Tammareddy is an Indian surname. Notable people with the surname include:

 Tammareddy Krishna Murthy (1920–2013), Telugu film producer
 Tammareddy Bharadwaja (born 1948), Indian film producer and director
 Tammareddy Chalapathi Rao, Telugu character actor

Indian surnames